The Shepherd Building was a building in Montgomery, Alabama, U.S.. It was built in 1922, and designed by architect Frederick Ausfeld. It was donated to Troy University in 2002. It was listed on the National Register of Historic Places from May 22, 1986, to its demolition in November 2010.

See also
List of tallest buildings in Montgomery, Alabama

References

National Register of Historic Places in Alabama
Buildings and structures completed in 1922
Buildings and structures in Montgomery, Alabama
Demolished buildings and structures in Alabama
Buildings and structures demolished in 2010